Nua railway station is a railway station in Jhunjhunu district, Rajasthan. Its code is NUA. It serves Nua town. The station consists of a single platform. Passenger, Express trains halt here.

Trains

The following trains halt at Nua railway station in both directions:

 Delhi Sarai Rohilla–Sikar Express

References

Railway stations in Jhunjhunu district
Jaipur railway division